This is a list of renamed places in Madagascar.

For most of these places the French name is still commonly used, including in administrative papers & nameplates on public places.

Cities and towns 
 Hell-Ville → Andoany
 Antananarivo → Tananarive (1895) → Antananarivo (1976)
 Diego-Suarez → Antsiranana (1975)
 Port Bergé → Boriziny
 Fénérive Est → Fenoarivo Atsinanana
 Majunga → Mahajanga (1989)
 Assada → Nosy Be
 Île Sainte-Marie → Nosy Boraha
 Joffreville → Ambohitra
 Tamatave → Toamasina
 Taolankarana → Fort-Dauphin (1643) → Tolanaro (1975)
 Tuléar → Toliara (1970s)
 Brickaville  → Vohibinany
 Périnet → Andasibe, Moramanga
 Port Saint-Louis  → Antsohimbondrona (Diana)
 Babetville  →  Ankadinondry Sakay
 Foulepointe  →  Mahalevona
 Saint Augustin, Madagascar → Ianantsony

See also 
 Lists of renamed places

References 

Geography of Madagascar
Madagascar history-related lists
Madagascar
Madagascar, renamed places
Madagascar geography-related lists
Madagascar
Madagascar